My Dear Secretary is a 1948 American comedy film written and directed by Charles Martin (1910-1983) and starring Laraine Day, Kirk Douglas, Keenan Wynn, and Helen Walker. The supporting cast features Rudy Valee, Alan Mowbray and Irene Ryan.

Plot 
Successful novelist and playboy Owen Waterbury (Kirk Douglas) hires aspiring writer Stephanie 'Steve' Gaylord (Laraine Day) as his secretary; a dream come true for Steve who admires Owen and his work. Steve soon finds out that the egomaniacal Owen has gone through a series of secretaries who have left when they are fed up with his behaviour. He is constantly in debt and cannot begin to write a contracted novel that will pay his bills including a lucrative advance by his publisher. Steve and Owen end up marrying, and Steve perseveres until the novel, based on the events of Steve's life and that mentions a character based on his publisher shown in an unflattering light, is refused publication.

Owen claims he cannot have a wife and a secretary so fires his wife and goes back to his old ways, hiring an admiring and attractive female to be his secretary. In the meantime Steve takes Owen's rejected manuscript to her former companion, Charles Harris (Rudy Vallee), who is a major publisher. Harris, who now employs Elsie (Helen Walker), Owen's former secretary before Steve, also agrees to read Steve's manuscript.

Harris finds Owen's manuscript interesting but ordinary, but believes Steve's manuscript to be not only worthy of publication but a serious candidate for literary prizes. Steve initially refuses publication due to hurting Owen's fragile ego but soon changes her mind because of the philandering. Steve goes on to be a best-selling author, causing Owen extreme annoyance. She hires an attractive male secretary, after which Owen snaps and insists that he will be her secretary. Steve narrates a book based on their life to Owen. They end up getting back together.

Cast 
 Laraine Day as Stephanie 'Steve' Gaylord
 Kirk Douglas as Owen Waterbury
 Keenan Wynn as Ronnie Hastings
 Helen Walker as Elsie
 Rudy Vallee as Charles Harris
 Florence Bates as Horrible Hannah Reeve
 Alan Mowbray as Deveny
 Helene Stanley as Miss 'Clay' Pidgeon
 Irene Ryan as Mary
 Gale Robbins as Dawn O'Malley
 Grady Sutton as Sylvan Scott
 Virginia Hewitt as Felicia Adams

References

External links 

 
 
 
 
 
 

1948 films
1940s English-language films
American black-and-white films
1948 romantic comedy films
United Artists films
American romantic comedy films
Films scored by Heinz Roemheld
Films directed by Charles Martin
1940s American films